King Chadae (71–165, r. 146–165) was the seventh ruler of Goguryeo, the northernmost of the Three Kingdoms of Korea. Although his wife is unknown, he had at least a son named Prince Chu'an (추안, 鄒安) who escaped from the palace after King Sin ascended the throne and then asked the king to spare his life and pardoned later.

Background and rise to the throne
According to the Samguk Sagi, he was the younger brother of the previous king Taejo the Great. He was said to be brave but cruel.

During his brother's reign, Chadae successfully repelled attacks by Han Dynasty China, and gained power within the Goguryeo court. After eliminating opponents, including Go Bok-jang, he eventually received the throne from Taejo, who was probably forced to abdicate in 146.

Reign
Chadae continued to consolidate power even after rising to the throne. In the third year of his reign, he ordered the deaths of Taejo's two sons, forced one of his brothers to commit suicide, and persecuted his youngest brother Baekgo (later King Sindae).

Following several natural disasters and civil unrest, he was killed by his minister Myeongnim Dap-bu, according to the Samguk Sagi. According to the Samguk Yusa, the subsequent king Sindae killed both Chaedae and Taejo.

See also
History of Korea
Three Kingdoms of Korea
List of Korean monarchs

References

Goguryeo rulers
71 births
165 deaths
2nd-century monarchs in Asia
2nd-century Korean people
1st-century Korean people